Pierre Gage (born 3 January 1977 in Montreal, Quebec), known by his last name Gage, is a Francophone Canadian singer and songwriter.

Biography
Born in Montreal, Quebec, Gage is of Haitian and Jamaican descent. Gage got his start in the music business while still attending high school by landing the role of Johny Roquefort after attending an audition for the rock opera Starmania.  Thus began his career as a musician heavily influenced by Bob Marley, Stevie Wonder, Marvin Gaye and Lauryn Hill; influences partly explained by Gage's Jamaican and Haitian roots.

The pivotal moment in Gage's career came when he met Corneille and Gardy Martin with whom he started the group R'n'B O.N.E.  Thanks to Corneille's writing and composing talents, O.N.E.'s single "Zoukin" reached number one on the Canadian radio airplay chart.  The group then went on tour, opening for acts such as Isabelle Boulay and Kelis

In January 2001, three years after the formation of O.N.E, Corneille left the group to pursue a solo career. Gage followed the same path, at first concentrating on acting and theatre before returning to music.

Corneille and Gage maintained a working relationship, with Gage opening for Corneille during Corneille's 2003 tour. Gage began to have success on his own thanks to his single "Trop Fresh", which attracted a significant fan base.

Gage's first album Soul Rebel, of which most of the songs were written, composed, and produced by Corneille, came out in July 2005.  The album contains a mix of soul and reggae music.

Discography

Albums

 2005: Soul Rebel
 Pense à moi
 Le départ
 Dis moi
 Te quiero
 Viens me voir
 L’homme d’une femme
 Demain
 Je t’aime quand même
 Trop fresh
 Ce soir
 N’arrête pas
 Viens me voir (acoustique)

 2008: Changer le monde
 Changer le monde
 Un jour à la foi
 Dimanche
 Pardonne-moi
 Doudou
 Tu peux choisir (feat Vitaa)
 Mon frère
 T'étais où ?
 Ailleurs
 J'envoie un SOS
 Sous les étoiles
 Je veux être libre
 Doudou Remix

Singles
 February 2005: Trop Fresh
 September 2005 : Pense à moi
 March 2006 : Je t’aime quand même

1977 births
Living people
21st-century Black Canadian male singers
French-language singers of Canada
Singers from Montreal
Canadian people of Haitian descent
Canadian people of Jamaican descent
Canadian pop singers